Tomasz Wojciech Wałdoch (born 10 May 1971) is a Polish former professional footballer who played as a defender in Poland and Germany.

Wałdoch had a ten-year international career with Poland. He often captained the side, including at the 2002 World Cup. Most of his club career was spent in German leagues with VfL Bochum and Schalke 04.

Club career
Wałdoch played for Górnik Zabrze, VfL Bochum, Schalke 04 and Jagiellonia Białystok.

International career
Wałdoch played for the Poland national team, for a total of 74 caps. He was a participant at the 1992 Summer Olympics, where Poland won the silver medal. He was the captain of the Polish team for the 2002 World Cup.

Coaching career
On 1 July 2006, Wałdoch was named as the assistant coach of the FC Schalke 04 U17 team. From 15 April 2008 until 30 June 2008, he was the assistant coach at Schalke 04 II. On 11 November 2009, it was announced that he would become the temporary Assistant coach of Poland national team, assisting Franciszek Smuda. He was later replaced in the role by his former teammate Jacek Zielinski. On 20 April 2010, he was named as the Director of Sport of his first professional club Górnik Zabrze. He left later that year, in November. He went on to be coach of the Schalke 04 U17 team from July 2011 to June 2012. From July 2012 to June 2014, he was the coach of the Schalke 04 Jugend team. Currently, he is the assistant coach of the Schalke 04 II team for the second time, serving under Jürgen Luginger.

Personal life
Wałdoch holds German citizenship. He is married with four children – two sons and two daughters. His son Kamil (born 4 July 1992) currently plays in the German fourth-tier for club FC Kray, situated in Essen.

Career statistics
Scores and results list Poland's goal tally first, score column indicates score after each Wałdoch goal.

Honours
VfL Bochum
 2. Bundesliga: 1995–96

Schalke 04
 Bundesliga: runner-up 2000–01
 DFB-Pokal: 2000–01, 2001–02
 DFB-Ligapokal: 2005; runner-up 2001, 2002
 UEFA Intertoto Cup: 2003, 2004

References

External links

 
 
 
 

Living people
1971 births
Sportspeople from Gdańsk
Polish footballers
Association football defenders
Poland international footballers
2002 FIFA World Cup players
Olympic medalists in football
Medalists at the 1992 Summer Olympics
Footballers at the 1992 Summer Olympics
Olympic footballers of Poland
Olympic silver medalists for Poland
Ekstraklasa players
Bundesliga players
Górnik Zabrze players
VfL Bochum players
FC Schalke 04 players
Jagiellonia Białystok players
Polish expatriate footballers
Polish expatriate sportspeople in Germany
Expatriate footballers in Germany